Milonga (translation: Tango)   is a 1999  Italian giallo film co-written and directed by Emidio Greco.  For his performance Giancarlo Giannini won the Globo d'oro for best actor.

Plot    
In one of the most central squares of Rome, Piazza Barberini, the famous TV star Aldo Ruggeri is killed in broad daylight. The commissioner, accompanied by agent Ginevra Scapuzzo, arrives on the spot to start the investigation. After various vicissitudes the commissioner, thanks to a tango listened to on the radio, will be able to connect the facts by discovering the killers. Going to Milonga, that is the place where the tango is danced, he will find the two killers, a man and a woman. When the music ends, in a firefight, the commissioner kills the man while the girl manages to escape.

Cast 
 Giancarlo Giannini: Inspector
 Claudia Pandolfi:  Scapuzzo
 Carlo Cecchi:  "Character A"
 Irene Ferri:  Killer woman
 Gianni Sperti:  Killer man
 Yvonne Sciò:  Marlene
 Vanessa Gravina:  Rossella

See also  
 List of Italian films of 1999

References

External links

1999 films
Giallo films
Films directed by Emidio Greco
1999 crime thriller films
Films scored by Luis Bacalov
1990s Italian films